Handfish are any anglerfish within the family Brachionichthyidae, a group which comprises five genera and 14 extant species.  These benthic marine fish are unusual in the way they propel themselves by walking on the sea floor rather than swimming.

Distribution
Handfish are found today in the coastal waters of southern and eastern Australia and around the island state of Tasmania. This is the most species-rich of the few marine fish families endemic to the Australian region, with all but three species found there. There are 14 species of handfish around Tasmania.

The biology of handfishes is poorly known and their typically small population sizes and restricted distributions make them highly vulnerable to disturbance. Some species are considered to be critically endangered.

Anatomy
They are slow-moving fish that prefer to 'walk' rather than swim, using their modified pectoral fins to move about on the sea floor. These highly modified fins have the appearance of hands, hence their scientific name, from Latin bracchium meaning "arm" and Greek ichthys meaning "fish".

Like other anglerfish, they possess an illicium, a modified dorsal fin ray above the mouth, but it is short and does not appear to be used as a fishing lure. The second dorsal spine is joined to the third by a flap of skin, making a crest.

Fossil record

The prehistoric species, Histionotophorus bassani, from the Lutetian of Monte Bolca, is now considered to be a handfish, sometimes even being included in the genus Brachionichthys. Considering the low extant diversity, restricted geographical distribution, and very meagre fossil record of antennarioids in general,  the existence of fossil representatives of the family Brachionichthyidae is unusual.

Conservation status 

In 1996, the spotted handfish (Brachionichthys hirsutus) was the first marine fish to be listed as critically endangered in the IUCN Red List. With its only habitat in the Derwent River estuary and surrounds, it is threatened by the Northern Pacific seastar's invasion into southern Australian waters. The Northern Pacific seastar (Asterias amurensis), preys on not only the fish eggs, but also on the sea squirts (ascidians) that help to form the substrate that the fish spawn on.

The cause of the decline in spotted handfish is unclear. Suggested causes may include disturbance of benthic communities and predation on egg masses by the introduced northern Pacific seastar, habitat modification through increased siltation, heavy metal contamination or urban effluent. The lack of a pelagic larval stage and low rates of dispersal may be responsible for their restricted distributions and may also have an impact on handfishes ability to recolonise areas where they once occurred.

In March 2020, the smooth handfish (Sympterichthys unipennis) was declared extinct in the IUCN Red List. Once common enough to be one of the first fish to be described by European explorers of Australia, but not seen for well over a century, this is the first modern-day marine fish to be officially declared extinct. However, this was reversed in September 2021, as there is not sufficient data to confirm this status.

Prior to this sighting, it had been assumed that this species was confined to shallow waters. The discovery that it has a greater range than previously thought may give cause for optimism regarding its survival.

Current status of species
 three species of handfish are listed as threatened under the Environment Protection and Biodiversity Conservation Act 1999 (EPBC Act) and the IUCN:
Brachionichthys hirsutus, spotted handfish – Critically Endangered under EPBC Act and IUCN;

Thymichthys politus, red handfish – Critically Endangered under EPBC Act and IUCN; and

Brachiopsilus ziebelli, Ziebell's handfish – Vulnerable under EPBC Act, Critically Endangered under IUCN. 

All three of the above are listed as Endangered under the Tasmanian Threatened Species Protection Act 1995, and all handfish species are protected under the Tasmanian Living Marine Resources Management Act 1995, which prohibits their collection in State waters without a permit.

Footnotes

References

External links 

Bradley, Carolyn. Pictures: Nine Fish With "Hands" Found to Be New Species (National Geographic, 25 May 2010) - Pink handfish formally identified.

Brachionichthyidae
 
Extant Lutetian first appearances
Taxa named by Theodore Gill